is a Japanese television announcer for the Akita Television in Akita and the play-by-play broadcaster for the Akita Northern Happinets of the B.League in Japan.
Born in Akita, Takeshima graduated from Toin Gakuen High School in Yokohama and earned his academic degree in communications from Meiji University. 
He likes kendo (third-dan grade) and rakugo.

References

External links

1986 births
Living people
Akita Northern Happinets
Basketball announcers
Blaublitz Akita
Japanese sports announcers
Meiji University alumni